The 20th United States Colored Infantry was an infantry regiment that served in the Union Army during the American Civil War. The regiment was composed of African American enlisted men commanded by white officers and was authorized by the Bureau of Colored Troops which was created by the United States War Department on May 22, 1863.

Service
The 20th U.S. Colored Infantry was organized at Rikers Island, New York February 9, 1864 for three-year service and mustered under the command of Colonel Nelson B. Bartrum.

The regiment was attached to Department of the East to March 1864. Defenses of New Orleans, Louisiana, Department of the Gulf, to December 1864. District of West Florida and Southern Alabama, Department of the Gulf, to February 1865. Defenses of New Orleans to June 1865. District of La Fourche, Department of the Gulf, to October 1865.

The 20th U.S. Colored Infantry mustered out of service October 7, 1865.

Detailed service
Ordered to the Department of the Gulf March 1864, arriving at New Orleans March 20. Moved to Port Hudson, La., March 21 and to Pass Cavallo, Texas, April 21. In District of Carrollton, La., June. At Plaquemine July. At Camp Parapet and Chalmette August, 1864. At Camp Parapet and in District of Carrollton until December. Ordered to West Pascagoula, Fla., December 26. Return to New Orleans February 1865, and duty there until June. At Nashville, Tenn., August.

Casualties
The regiment lost a total of 285 men during service; 2 officers and 283 enlisted men died of disease.

Commanders
 Colonel Nelson B. Bartrum

See also

 List of United States Colored Troops Civil War Units
 United States Colored Troops

References
 Dyer, Frederick H. A Compendium of the War of the Rebellion (Des Moines, IA: Dyer Pub. Co.), 1908.
Attribution

United States Colored Troops Civil War units and formations
Military units and formations established in 1864
Military units and formations disestablished in 1865